Grizzy & the Lemmings is a French computer-animated television series produced by Studio Hari with the participation of France Télévisions, Cartoon Network and Boomerang. It is a silent comedy focusing on a grizzly bear, named Grizzy, having to deal with the group of the eponymous lemmings, who he is irritated by. The show has no real dialogue, as characters will speak gibberish.

The series was announced on June 22, 2015, and debuted internationally in the fall of 2016. It was renewed for a second season on July 5, 2017, which is stated to air on a number of channels around the globe in 2018. Season 1 was released for Netflix on July 15, 2019. In 2019, Hari Productions (Studio Hari) announced the development of the third season, titled Grizzy & the Lemmings World Tour. Season 3 came out in 2021 ended in October 8, 2022.

Synopsis
Grizzy and the Lemmings is set in Nutty Hill National Forest, a fictional Canadian park, at the hillside cabin of the park's mostly unseen forest ranger. When the ranger leaves for work each day, Grizzy, a grizzly bear, slips into the cabin and takes advantage of its numerous amenities, usually seeking to relax, watch television and snack. He always finds his peace disturbed by a pack of rambunctious and mischief-making blue-gray lemmings who all have similar personalities.

As Grizzy and the lemmings are drawn into conflict, various pieces of high-tech equipment and sometimes magic objects in and around the cabin come into play, as the lemmings seek to make more mischief and Grizzy tries to stop them. The battle almost invariably spills onto the passing highway and beyond, leading to high-speed chases. Every episode ends in a bad ending for both parties as they have backed themselves inextricably trapped or stuck in a mess or stalemate or others (Strangely, they seemingly are back the next episode) and even look at the viewer while uttering annoyed groans.  The program is very reminiscent of the classic cartoon: Wile E. Coyote and the Roadrunner  , with painted on tunnels that work for the lemmings but not the bear.  And as with other similar cartoons, inspite of the terrible things that happen,  no one is ever permanently injured.  They are hit by log trucks, shot by rockets, crushed by boulders, electrocuted, blown up by explosives and so on. But always come back to try again.

Characters

Main
 Grizzy (voiced by ) is an anthropormorphic Grizzly bear who has a brown body and light brown fat stomach, lives in the Forest Ranger's cabin. He is approximately 7-feet tall in height and wears a green-colored locket, which belonged to the Forest Ranger. In the cabin he does not do anything except sleeping on the sofa, watch TV and eat salmon with Yummy XL (chocolate spread). He likes watching a TV program entitled "The Secret of the Salmon". He dislikes opera music, which sometimes starts when he is switching channels. The only thing that stands in his way of luxury is the Lemmings, who cause him a lot of trouble and mischief. Grizzy does not like them and so doesn't like to share anything with them. In the episode "Intensive Care", it is shown that when the Lemmings get sick, he develops some sympathy for them. He does not say anything meaningful but he was seen reading English from a mobile phone screen. Grizzy is actually very smart, able to find a solution to any situation. Said to be the most feared predator in the Canadian preserve he lives in, he believes he's at the top of the food chain, which is why he believes in living in the forest ranger's home, as he is capable of using all the appliances and other technology items.
 Lemmings (voiced by Josselin Charier) are a group of anthropomorphic lemmings with blue bodies and light bluish gray stomachs, also inhabiting Forest Ranger's cabin. All of them have the same appearance, behaviors, mannerisms, and interests. Their motto: "Tabodi! (fun for all and all for fun!)" Said to be a tribe of forty, the Lemmings single motivation of fun gets them into trouble with Grizzy. Dispite their intelligence, their personality is that of dim-witted teenage pranksters, but they appear to work very well as a team, make Grizzy's life in the cabin a hard one. They love having rave parties and they also eat Yummy XL like Grizzy, stealing Grizzy's at every opportunity. They love watching a TV program about a cat and a mouse (a parody of Tom and Jerry). They can sing lullabies that make Grizzy fall asleep. They also love to dance to music, which Grizzy dislikes. They also do not like to share anything with him. They cause a lot of chaos, with most of their mischief being targeted at Grizzy.  Like Grizzy they love technology, like 3D printers, and anything they can use to make their skate board go faster.  Yes, they ride a skate board.

Minor
 She-Bear – She is the female anthropomorphic grizzly bear who is Grizzy's love interest. Unfortunately for Grizzy, she shares no interest in him and his attempts to impress her end in failure, either caused by him or by the Lemmings. The She-Bear has an interest in the natural wildlife, but on some occasions in the episodes she takes part in the crazy antics between Grizzy and the Lemmings. Her color and height are the same as Grizzy but she is slimmer and has a heart-shaped spot on her belly. In season 2, she received a redesign, giving her a huge pink spot (like Grizzy's) on her belly, instead of the former heart-shaped spot. She always has a flower accessorized in her hair. She lives in the forest and loves sniffing flowers, watching butterflies and kites. She sleeps at night on a log of wood in the forest. She also likes popcorn. It's revealed in the episode "Babysitting", where she has a bear cub daughter "She-Bear Kid". She-Bear has featured a larger role with main characters in the episode "Mind in a Whirl".
 Other creatures – There are also some other animals, birds and insects in the forest but they are not anthropomorphic like Grizzy, the Lemmings and She-bear. They don't do anything like the three of them and live in the forest like real and simple animals. Both Grizzy and the Lemmings tend to use these animals for their own schemes, but usually, by the end of every episode, both of them suffer from the hilarious consequences of their actions. Sometimes other living organisms also get caught up in these troubles.
 Moose – Many moose appear in episodes of the show. The Lemmings (and sometimes Grizzy) use them for transportation. The moose are fond of eating carrots so sometimes lemmings hang a carrot in front of his eyes to make them run. But they can eat other things like glass bottles or a ring as shown in "Bear Luck" and "Clean Bear". They are incredibly passive and don't do anything apart from graze. The color of nearly all of the Mooses is mostly brown but a Black colored Moose is shown in the episodes "A Midsummer Bear's Dream" and in "Wandering Spirits". A Moose is featured in a larger role with Grizzy and Lemmings in the episode "Rainbow Moose".
 Partridge/Ruffed grouse – These Mountain bamboo partridge birds are often used as a mode of transport by the Lemmings. Grizzy also uses them in many situations. They have big eyes and the color of their feathers are brown and black. Sometimes a partridge becomes bigger in size due to the actions and consequences of Grizzy and the lemmings. A giant partridge is shown in the episodes "A Midsummer's Bear dream", "Timeless Bear" and "The Bear Next Door" (not in the main background but in another place). In the show, the partridges fly in the sky. They are largely featured with Grizzy and the lemmings in the episodes "A Sizeable Problem" and "Call of the Bear".
 Frog – Frogs are generally shown eating flies. In the show the tongues of the frogs are long. Frogs are featured mainly with the main characters in the episode "Bear Charm".
 Fly – Flies are generally shown being eaten by Frogs. A fly has mainly shown with the main characters in the episode "Yummy Fly".
 Butterfly – Butterflies on the show are generally seen in blue, pink or yellow colors. The She-Bear loves them. Butterflies are usually small in size but a big butterfly is shown in episodes "Timeless Bear", "The Bear Next Door" and "The Bear And The Butterfly"(in this episode the butterfly has a larger role with main characters).
 Raccoon – The raccoons on the show are dirty and often rummage in the trash and eat garbage. Their noses twitch very fast. The lullaby of lemmings also makes them go to sleep as shown in the episode "Inspector Grizzy". A raccoon has been featured in a large role with the main cast in the episodes "Bear's Best Friend", "Sniffer Raccoon" and "Masked Raccoon".
 Spider – Spiders in the show are rarely seen. Their color is mainly black. Grizzy has a fear of spiders, shown in the episode "Spider Lemmings".
 Tyrannosaurus Rex – A T-rex (Dinosaur(s)) is unfrozen from a block of ice in "Jurassic Bear" (red and green in colour) and also appears in episodes "Timeless Bear", "The Bear Next Door" (in lime-green color), "Ancestral Bear" and "Surprise Deglaciation".
 Bat – Bats (appears in season 2) in the show, are also rarely seen. Bats have a larger role with Grizzy and Lemmings in the episode "BatGrizzy" (in this episode, it is shown that they do not like anyone controlling them for their own means).
 Polar Bear – A polar bear appears in the episode "Ice and Bears". He quickly overheats without ice and behaves like a playful dog when cooled, becoming a pal to the Lemmings and a perplexing annoyance to Grizzy.
 Forest Ranger – The Forest Ranger very rarely appears in person. His only appearance in the show is in the intro and in the episode "As Far As Bear Can Remember" in a flashback. He is shown as a man who left his cabin in the forest where the bear and the lemmings now live. In some episodes, his poster and photos are shown. He is the only human character in the show.

World Tour has the Chinese Partridge, which is an extremely Chinese version of the original partridge. The following species which appear are:

Episodes

Staff

Broadcast 

Grizzy & the Lemmings originates in France, where it aired on networks France 3, Cartoon Network and Boomerang.

 The series initially aired on Boomerang in the UK and Ireland from October 10, 2016. Then it airs on Pop and Pop Max.
 In Italy, the show is telecast on Boomerang, Boing, Cartoonito, Cartoon Network.
 In Germany, it airs from November 7, 2016 on Boomerang, Super RTL and Cartoon Network.
 In Canada, Grizzy & the Lemmings airs on from December 17, 2016 on Télé-Québec, Family Channel, Cartoon Network, Family CHRGD and Family Jr.
 In France, the series aired from December 31, 2016 and it first broadcast on France 3 in the Ludo youth box. The season 1 of the series is re-telecast on Boomerang since September 4, 2017 and on France 4 from February 19, 2018. The broadcast of season 2 begins on France 3 and in the Ludo youth box on April 6, 2019. "Grizzy and the Lemmings World Tour", the third season, was premiered on the Okoo platform on July 2, 2021, and from August 28, 2021, on France 4.
 It also aired in India from January 2, 2017 to 2020 on Pogo. From December 2020, Cartoon Network started re-telecasting the first two seasons of the series. Season 3 titled Grizzy and the Lemmings : World Tour released on August 9, 2021, on Cartoon Network. In February 2022, Pogo started broadcasting the series again. The Indian version of the show is unique in that it has Hindi dialogue dubbed over, by Manoj Pandey (as the narrator of the show and as Grizzy) and Anshul Saxena (as the Lemmings). The characters' names were also localized.
 In the United States, Grizzy & the Lemmings made its debut on April 3, 2017 on Boomerang. The second season of the show was premiered in the USA on September 2, 2018. It is premiered on Cartoon Network on January 7, 2023.
 It also airs in Pakistan on Cartoon Network.
 In Russia, the show is aired on Boomerang, Cartoon Network and Carousel
 It also aired on Cartoon Network in Sri Lanka, the Philippines and Bangladesh.
 In countries Romania and Turkey, it telecast on Boomerang and Cartoon Network.
 It also aired in Poland on Cartoon Network, Boomerang, and Puls 2.
 In Italy, the show is telecast on Boing, Cartoonito, Cartoon Network and Boomerang.
 It airs on Boing in Spain.
 The series initially aired on Boomerang in the UK and Ireland from August 8, 2015.
 In Iceland, it airs on RUV.
 It also aired in Netherlands on the channels NPO Zappelin, Cartoon Network and Boomerang.
 In Belgium, the series has been broadcast on OUF since September 2017.
 In Indonesia, this television series started broadcasting on ANTV only in 2020, but is still broadcast on Boomerang and Cartoon Network until now.

International broadcast 
The show airs in the following countries:

Accolades

Despite getting bad reviews, (but getting generally positive reviews) the show was popular in different nations:

 On February 12, 2018, Grizzy & the Lemmings won the Laurier in the youth animation category, at the 23rd ceremony of the Lauriers de la Radio et de la Télévision.
 On February 13, 2018, Grizzy and the Lemmings won the Kidscreen Awards for best-animated series, Kids category, at the 2018 Kidscreen Summit in Miami.
 In April 2018, the show receives an EMIL Award for the best children's programs, awarded by the German magazine TV Spielfilm.
 In October 2018, Grizzy and the Lemmings won the award for best TV series at the TOFUZI International Animated Film Festival in Georgia.
 On March 18, 2019, the show won the TV France International Animation export prize at the Trianon in Paris.
 On September 7, 2019, Grizzy et les Lemmings (season 2) was awarded the Best Children's Television Program Award by the International Dytiatko Festival in Ukraine.

In other media 

Adventure Grizzy Go, Grizzy Bubble, Grizzly Escape, Grizzy Jump, Flappy Lemmings and Lemmings Flight are some video games which are based on this television series.

See also
 List of French animated television series
 List of French television series

References

External links 
 Grizzy and the Lemmings on the Studio Hari website
 Grizzy and the Lemmings at Boomerang
 
 Official YouTube channel

2010s French animated television series
2016 French television series debuts
2022 French television series endings
French children's animated comedy television series
French computer-animated television series
Boomerang (TV network) original programming
Animated television series about bears
Animated television series without speech
Grizzy and the Lemmings
Fictional bears
Television shows set in Canada